The Cyprus Police Aviation Unit (CPAU) (is the police aviation unit of the Headquarters of Cyprus Police, the national police of the Republic of Cyprus and was established on 10 June 2008, having previously operated as the Cyprus Police Air Wing (from 1990 to 9.6.2008).

Mission
The mission of the CPAU is as follows:

 Surveillance of the coast and of the territorial limits of the Republic of Cyprus, as well as the patrol of the Nicosia FIR (Flight Information Region) in cooperation with other units, with the aim of preventing drug trafficking, illegal immigration and terrorism.
 Supervision and surveillance of the highways and main roads.
 Search and Rescue missions aiming at saving lives and property in the case of naval or aviation accidents that occur within the Nicosia FIR.
 Transport of patients or injured persons to a suitable medical center in Cyprus
 Fire fighting and support of other fire fighting units
 Location of exhibits under water with the support of C.P.A.U. divers
 Transport of Police members and other government personnel on special missions
 Transport of high-level government officials and VIPs.
 Escort of motor convoys with high-level officials and VIPs.
 Execution of any missions which are assigned to the C.P.A.U. by the Cyprus Joint Rescue Coordination Center (JRCC).
 Execution of any other duties, which are requested by the Chief of Police.

Fleet

Timeline
In November 2012 the Britten-Norman Islander was sold for 75,000 euros along with its spare parts for another 75,000 euros although a Police report was suggesting that the plane should be repaired for 250,000 euros.

In December 2013 the Minister of Justice and Public Order, Mr. Ionas Nicolaou, ordered an investigation on the sale of the Britten-Norman Islander, after it was discovered that although the plane was deemed unsuitable to fly for more than 40 hours, it actually flew from Cyprus to Finland, where the buyer was located, and was now on sale for 750,000 euros by the new owner after it was repaired.

In 2015 the two Bell helicopters were send to be repainted to the new blue and white color scheme to replace the older yellow, light blue and white color scheme that they were painted. This new blue and white color scheme is the same that the Augusta Westland helicopters were painted when they were first received.

See also
Cyprus Agencies related topics:
Cyprus Air Forces
Cyprus Civil Defence
Cyprus Fire Service
Cyprus Joint Rescue Coordination Center
Cyprus Police
Cyprus Port & Marine Police

Cyprus Police Aviation Unit Mission related topics:
Helicopter bucket
Helitack
Medical evacuation
Police aviation
Ethiopian Airlines Flight 409

References

External links
http://www.police.gov.cy/

Police, Aviation Unit
Police aviation